39 Bite Pu is a 2014 Burmese comedy film, directed by Nyunt Myanmar Nyi Nyi Aung starring Nay Toe, Wai Lu Kyaw, Wutt Hmone Shwe Yi, Chaw Yadanar and Soe Myat Thuzar.

Cast
Nay Toe as Lu Chaw
Wai Lu Kyaw as Sein Paw
Wutt Hmone Shwe Yi as Sunny
Chaw Yadanar as Zu Zu
Soe Myat Thuzar as Daw Sein Net
Ye Aung as Father of Sunny
Moe Di as U Di Lone
Bay Lu Wa as Punk Bay
May Thinzar Oo as Daw Thinzar

References

.

2014 films
2010s Burmese-language films
Films shot in Myanmar
2014 comedy films
Burmese comedy films